Dumitru Ciobotaru (8 January 1927 – 2007) was a Romanian boxer. He competed in the men's light heavyweight event at the 1952 Summer Olympics.

References

1927 births
2007 deaths
Romanian male boxers
Olympic boxers of Romania
Boxers at the 1952 Summer Olympics
Sportspeople from Galați
Light-heavyweight boxers